The Outsider is a 1926 American 60-minute silent drama film directed by Rowland V. Lee and starring Jacqueline Logan, Lou Tellegen, and Walter Pidgeon. It was based on the 1923 play The Outsider by Dorothy Brandon. The screenplay is set in London and concerns an unorthodox doctor who cures a patient with whom he is in love.

The film was remade as a British sound film in 1931, which was released by Metro Goldwyn Mayer.

Plot
As described in a film magazine review, Leontine Sturdee and her dancing partner Basil Owen tour Hungry. They meet Anton Ragatzy, a mystic faith healer who falls in love with the young woman. When she is injured during an acrobatic dance move, she is taken to London where the doctors pronounce her an incurable cripple. Anton follows her to London where he offers her aid but is denounced by the doctors. Finally he obtains admission to see Leontine. After several failures she is able to rise and walk at his command. Leontine realizes that it was not his healing abilities but their mutual love that wrought the cure.

Cast
 Jacqueline Logan as Leontine Sturdee
 Lou Tellegen as Anton Ragatzy 
 Walter Pidgeon as Basil Owen 
 Roy Atwell as Jerry Sidon 
 Charles Willis Lane as Sir Jasper Sturdee 
 Joan Standing as Pritchard 
 Gibson Gowland as Shadow 
 Bertram Marburgh as Dr. Talley 
 Crauford Kent as Dr. Ladd 
 Louis Payne as Dr. Helmore

See also
1937 Fox vault fire

Preservation
Witn no prints of The Outsider located in any film archives, it is a lost film.

References

External links

1926 films
1926 drama films
American silent feature films
Silent American drama films
1920s English-language films
Films directed by Rowland V. Lee
American black-and-white films
Films set in London
1920s American films